9 Pin Zhi (Chinese: 九品制) was an ancient Chinese ranking system for the game of Go, which first appeared in the 3rd century book Classic of Arts by Handan Chun. He ranks 9 different Pin (levels) for Go players, from strong to weak:

夫围棋之品有九：There are 9 levels in go:

 一曰入神 – 1 pin Being in the Spirit
 二曰坐照 – 2 pin Seated in Enlightenment
 三曰具体 – 3 pin Concreteness
 四曰通幽 – 4 pin Understanding changes
 五曰用智 – 5 pin Applying Wisdom
 六曰小巧 – 6 pin Ability
 七曰斗力 – 7 pin Fighting Strength
 八曰若愚 – 8 pin Being Quite Inept
 九曰守拙 – 9 pin Being Truly Stupid

九品之外，今不复云。

This system is loosely based on the Nine-rank system (traditional Chinese: 九品中正制 or 九品官人法), used at the imperial court to rank the importance of officials.

References

External links
围棋知识之围棋九品制

History of Go